Jordan IV (died 1288) was the Lord of L'Isle-Jourdain and a vassal of Alfonso of Poitou. He was a crusader during the Italian crusades of Guelph against Ghibelline. His son-in-law was Aimery IV of Narbonne, who led the armies of Florence and Anjou in the Battle of Campaldino in 1289 and his brother was the provost of Toulouse.

Sometime before his activities in Italy Jordan (Jourdan in contemporary Occitan) participated in a torneyamen, a poetical tournament, with Guiraut Riquier, Raimon Izarn, and Paulet de Marseilla.

In 1266, after drawing up a will, he brought a contingent of knights and crossbowmen to Italy with him in support of Charles of Anjou. He was praised by Pope Clement IV and enfeoffed in the Principate and Calabria by Charles, but he soon returned to Gascony. Charles warned him to return or suffer his fiefs to be confiscated and titles revoked, but he lingered until October 1282, when he returned with a new band of soldiers.

In 1285, he joined Philip III of France on the Aragonese Crusade. He died in 1288.

His first wife was Faydide, heiress of Odo, Lord of Casaubon. His second wife was Vacquerie, daughter of Adhémar, Lord of Monteil. From his first marriage he had:
Jordan V, his successor
Indie, married Bertrand, Lord of Caumont
Margaret, married Guy of Comminges

From his second marriage he had:
Bertrand, Lord of Mauvesin, Montagnac, Corbonne, Saint-Paul, Pibrac, Ausun, and Lombières
Joan, married the aforementioned Aimery
Thiburge, Lady of Pribac, married Gauthier du Fossé, Lord of Bramenac, and then Bernard IV of Astarac
Gaucerande, married Stephen Colonna

Sources
Durrieu, Paul. Les Gascons en Italie. Auch, 1885.
Housley, Norman. The Italian Crusades: The Papal-Angevin Alliance and the Crusades Against Christian Lay Powers, 1254-1343. Oxford University Press: 1982.
Betti, Maria Pia. "Le tenzoni del trovatore Guiraut Riquier." Studi mediolatini e volgari, 44 (1998), 7–193. Available at Rialto.

1288 deaths
Christians of the Crusades
13th-century French troubadours
Year of birth unknown
Gascons